Belmond La Résidence d’Angkor is a resort at the centre of Siem Reap in Cambodia. It is a short drive from the temples of Angkor Wat. It has large gardens containing a swimming pool and spa.
The resort was acquired by Orient-Express Hotels in 2006. In 2014 the company changed its name to Belmond Ltd. and the hotel was renamed Belmond La Résidence d’Angkor. In 2016, the hotel closed for 7 months to undergo extensive renovations and reopened at the end of November 2016.

References

External links 
Official website

Belmond hotels
Hotels in Cambodia
Hotel buildings completed in 2002
Hotels established in 2002